Cutwork or cut work, also known as punto tagliato in Italian, is a needlework technique in which portions of a textile, typically cotton or linen, are cut away and the resulting "hole" is reinforced and filled with embroidery or needle lace.

Cutwork is related to drawn thread work.  In drawn thread work, typically only the warp or weft threads are withdrawn (cut and removed), and the remaining threads in the resulting hole are bound in various ways.  In other types of cutwork, both warp and weft threads may be drawn.

Different forms of cutwork are or have traditionally been popular in a number of countries. Needlework styles that incorporate cutwork include broderie anglaise, Carrickmacross lace, whitework, early reticella, Spanish cutwork, hedebo, and jaali which is prevalent in India.

There are degrees of cutwork, ranging from the smallest amount of fabric cut away (Renaissance cutwork) to the greatest (Reticella cutwork). Richelieu cutwork in the middle.

Eyelet fabrics 
Cutwork is also used to create eyelet fabrics by cutting small round holes in them. After that, the edges of the holes are finished with embroidered stitches. The amount and closeness of stitching, as well as the quality of the background fabric, may vary in different types. Eyelet fabrics are an ever-popular type of fabric.

History
The cutwork technique originated in Italy at the time of the Renaissance, approximately the 14th, 15th, and 16th centuries.  In Renaissance embroidery and Richelieu work, the design is formed by cutting away the background fabric. In the Elizabethan era, cutwork was incorporated into the design and decoration of some ruffs. In a fashion sense, this type of needlework has migrated to countries around the world, including the United Kingdom, India, and the United States. Dresden samplers contained white cutwork, along with needle lace. Cutwork is still prevalent in fashion today, and although they are different, cutwork is commonly mistaken for lace. The eyelet pattern is one of the more identifiable types of cutwork in modern fashion. In eyelet embroidery, the design comes from the holes, rather than the fabric.

Traditional cutwork by country

Czech Republic 
Densely worked cutwork was traditional in many parts of the Czech Republic. Motifs might be circular, arc, or leaf-shaped. Because the motifs were often so close together, the embroidery looked like lace once all the motif centers were cut away.

Italy 
Embroidery pattern books after 1560 focused heavily on cutwork, as it became very popular in Italy. Initially, scrolling patterns worked in punto in aria were most evident, changing at the end of the century to reticella. The punto in aria technique involved laying threads over a linen ground, and then cutting the ground away. It was often use for freer patterns than the more geometric reticella, where squares of the ground cloth were cut out and embroidery was then applied.

Madeira 
in the 1850s, an Englishwoman, Miss Phelps, arrived in Madeira to recuperate, and she gave lessons in broderie anglaise. In the 1920s, after noting many skilled needlewomen. the Madeira Embroidery Guild was formed. Amongst its purposes was to set the pay and standards for embroiderers on the island. As indicated by the existence of the guild, many women in Madeira engaged in embroidery as a way of earning money for their families.

Netherlands 
Cutwork was popular throughout the Netherlands. An especially fine form of cutwork is called snee werk, used for decorating clothing such as aprons and blouses, and household items such as pillowcases.

Poland 
The eyelet form of cutwork was popular in the Polish countryside from the 1700s, if not earlier. It was used to decorate costumes and textiles for the home. The execution of this hand embroidery reached its height in the late 1800s, a prosperous time with more money for clothing. Eyelet embroidery was found on men's clothing as well as women's. For those who couldn't afford larger garments, eyelet collars that could be used to adorn different blouses were popular. Cutwork was usually done on white fabric, but around Sieradz, a pink and white striped cloth was sometimes used. Eyelet patterns were geometrical until the late 1800s. With the introduction of machine embroidery, designs became more diverse.

Sweden 
Hőlesom, or cutwork, was a traditional form of embroidery in Sweden, and used for household linens.

Hand cutwork 
Hand cutworks is the most traditional form of cutwork. Here, areas of the fabric are cut away and stitch is applied to stop the raw edges from fraying.

Laser cutwork

Laser cutwork allows for more precise and intricate patterns to be created. The laser also has the ability to melt and seal the edges of fabric with the heat of the laser. This helps against fabric fraying during the creation process. Additionally, using a laser for cutwork enables the embroiderer or creator to achieve unique designs such as an 'etched look' by changing the depth of the laser cut into the fabric.

References

External links

Virtual Museum of Textile Arts

Embroidery
Needle lace